The 2010 NCAA Division I men's soccer tournament was a tournament of 48 collegiate soccer teams who played for the NCAA Championship in soccer. The semifinals and final were held at Harder Stadium in Santa Barbara, California. All the other games were played at the home field of the higher seeded team (indicated by * for non-seeded teams). The final was held on December 12, 2010. Akron defeated Louisville, 1–0, for the title.

The bracket was announced November 15, 2010. The tournament started on November 18. The second round was played on November 21. The third round was played on November 28. The Regional Finals were played December 3 and 4.

Qualified teams

Automatic bids
All automatic bids are granted for winning a conference championship tournament, except for the automatic bid of the Ivy League, Pacific-10 Conference, and West Coast Conference, each given to the regular season champion. There were 22 automatic bids to the NCAA tournament.

At-large bids 

26 teams received at-large bids to the tournament.
 ACC - Boston College (10-4-5)
 ACC - Duke (9-5-4)
 ACC - North Carolina (16-3-1)
 ACC - Virginia (11-5-3)
 Big East - Connecticut (12-2-5)
 Big East - Georgetown (11-6-1)
 Big East - Notre Dame (10-5-4)
 Big East - Providence (12-5-3)
 Big East - South Florida (9-5-4)
 Big East - West Virginia (10-7-2)
 Big Ten - Indiana (9-7-2)
 Big Ten - Michigan State (11-7-1)
 Big Ten - Penn State (13-7-1)
 Big Ten - Ohio State (10-5-3)
 CAA - Old Dominion (9-6-2)
 Conference USA - Central Florida (11-4-3)
 Conference USA - SMU (15-2-0)
 Conference USA - Tulsa (11-6-2)
 Ivy League - Brown (11-3-3)
 Ivy League - Dartmouth (10-6-1)
 Ivy League - Penn (12-5-0)
 Missouri Valley - Creighton (12-5-1)
 Mountain Pacific - Denver (9-6-4)
 Mountain Pacific - New Mexico (9-5-5)
 Pacific-10 - UCLA (14-4-1)
 Southern - College of Charleston (10-4-3)

Regional 1

Regional 2

Regional 3

Regional 4

College Cup 
Harder Stadium, Santa Barbara, California

Goal scorers 
5 goals

  Justin Meram - Michigan

3 goals

  Scott Caldwell - Akron
  Darren Mattocks - Akron
  Ethan Finlay - Creighton
  Colby Meyer - Notre Dame
  Andrew Olsen - Dartmouth
  Charlie Campbell - Louisville
  Colin Rolfe - Louisville
  Corey Hertzog - Penn St.
  Eder Arreola - UCLA
  Chandler Hoffman - UCLA
  Franck Tayou - West Virginia

2 goals

  Perry Kitchen - Akron
  Michael Nanchoff - Akron
  John Fitzpatrick - California
  Nik Robson - Central Florida
  Cole Grossman - Duke
  Andy Adlard - Indiana
  Will Bruin - Indiana
  Nick DeLeon - Louisville
  Austin Berry - Louisville
  Aaron Horton - Louisville
  Domenic Barone - Michigan St.
  Wilder Arboleda - Providence
  Matt Marcin - Providence
  Ernesto Carranza - Sacramento St.
  Arthur Ivo - SMU
  Ashley McInnes - Tulsa
  Victor Chavez - UCLA

1 goal

  Kofi Sarkodie - Akron
  Kyle Bekker - Boston College
  Taylor Gorman - Brown
  Austin Mandel - Brown
  Jon Okafor - Brown
  Anthony Avalos - California
  Servando Carrasco - California
  Davis Paul - California
  Tony Salciccia - California
  Yaron Bacher - Central Florida
  Ben Hunt - Central Florida
  Ross Kelly - Coastal Carolina
  Andy Craven - College of Charleston
  Shawn Ferguson - College of Charleston
  Sean Flatley - College of Charleston
  Francis Twohig - College of Charleston
  Mamadou Diouf - Connecticut
  Sergio Castillo - Creighton
  Jose Gomez - Creighton
  Tyler Polak - Creighton
  Aaron Gaide - Dartmouth
  Bryan Giudicelli - Dartmouth
  Lucky Mkosana - Dartmouth
  Nick Pappas - Dartmouth
  Aaron Schoenfeld - ETSU
  Jaron Westbrook - ETSU
  Ian Christianson - Georgetown
  Chandler Diggs - Georgetown
  Andy Riemer - Georgetown
  Nikita Kotlov - Indiana
  Harrison Petts - Indiana
  Jason Herrick - Maryland
  Matt Kassel - Maryland
  Taylor Kemp - Maryland
  Patrick Mullins - Maryland
  John Stertzer - Maryland
  Casey Townsend - Maryland
  Greg Young - Maryland
  Latif Alashe - Michigan
  Fabio Pereira - Michigan
  Jeff Quijano - Michigan
  Soony Saad - Michigan
  Jeff Ricondo - Michigan St.
  Cyrus Saydee - Michigan St.
  Devon Sandoval - New Mexico
  Enzo Martínez - North Carolina
  Stephen McCarthy - North Carolina
  Kirk Urso - North Carolina
  Dillon Powers - Notre Dame
  Austin McAnena - Ohio State
  Omar Vallejo - Ohio State
  Konrad Warzycha - Ohio State
  Chris Harman - Old Dominion
  Alex Vaughan - Old Dominion
  Christian Barreiro - Penn
  Jordan Tyler - Penn State
  Antoine Hoppenot - Princeton
  Greg Davis - Providence
  Brian Grisell - Providence
  Toussaint McClure - Providence
  Chris Bettencourt - Sacramento St.
  Eric Masch - Santa Clara
  Juan Castillo - SMU
  Josue Soto - SMU
  Sam Arthur - South Carolina
  Bradlee Baladez - South Carolina
  Kevin Olson - St. Peter's
  Lebongang Pila  - St. Peter's
  Kyle Cumings - Tulsa
  Kelyn Rowe - UCLA
  Reed Williams - UCLA
  Waid Ibrahim - UC Santa Barbara
  Michael Tetteh - UC Santa Barbara
  Andrew Bulls - UMBC
  Levi Houapeu - UMBC
  Uwen Etuk - West Virginia
  Abel Sebele - West Virginia
  Uzi Tayou - West Virginia
  James Queree - Xavier

Own goals
  Eric Robertson - Brown (playing against California)
  Ray Gaddis - West Virginia (playing against Xavier)

See also
NCAA Men's Soccer Championship

References

2010 in American soccer
NCAA Division I Men's Soccer Tournament seasons
2010 NCAA Division I men's soccer season
NCAA Division I men's soccer tournament
NCAA Division I men's soccer tournament
NCAA Division I men's soccer tournament